Minuscule 830 (in the Gregory-Aland numbering), ε310 (von Soden), is a 13th-century Greek minuscule manuscript of the New Testament on parchment.

Description 
The codex contains the text of the four Gospels, on 222 parchment leaves (size ), with some lacunae. It lacks texts of  Matthew 10:15-25:3; Mark 14:28-16:20;  John 18:39-21:25. The text of Matthew 4:3-5:5 was supplied by a later hand. The text is written in one column per page, 26 lines per page.

The numbers of the Ammonian Sections are given with a references to the Eusebian Canons (written under Ammonian Sections) at the margin.

Text 
The Greek text of the codex is a representative of the Byzantine text-type. Hermann von Soden classified it to the textual family Kx. Kurt Aland placed it in Category V.
According to Gregory it could be related to the textual family f13.

According to the Claremont Profile Method it represents the textual family Kx in Luke 1 and Luke 20. In Luke 10 it represents textual cluster M27.

History 

C. R. Gregory and F. H. A. Scrivener dated the manuscript to the 13th century. Currently the manuscript is dated by the INTF to the 13th century.

The name of scribe was Arsenios. The manuscript once belonged to Simeon, a monk. It was examined and described by Antonio Rocci in 1882. It was added to the list of New Testament manuscripts by Scrivener (628) and Gregory (830e). Gregory saw it in 1886.

Currently the manuscript is housed at the Biblioteca della Badia (A' α. 8), in Grottaferrata.

See also 

 List of New Testament minuscules
 Biblical manuscript
 Textual criticism
 Minuscule 831

References

Further reading 

 
 Antonio Rocci, Codices cryptenses, seu Abbatiae Cryptae Ferratae in Tusculano digesti et illustrati (Tusculanum 1883), p. 8.

Greek New Testament minuscules
13th-century biblical manuscripts